Fusarium species include:

Species

 Fusarium acaciae
 Fusarium acaciae-mearnsii
 Fusarium acicola
 Fusarium acremoniopsis
 Fusarium acridiorum
 Fusarium acutatum
 Fusarium aderholdii
 Fusarium adesmiae
 Fusarium aduncisporum
 Fusarium aecidii-tussilaginis
 Fusarium aeruginosum
 Fusarium aethiopicum
 Fusarium affine
 Fusarium agaricorum
 Fusarium ailanthinum
 Fusarium alabamense
 Fusarium albedinis
 Fusarium albertii
 Fusarium albidoviolaceum
 Fusarium albiziae
 Fusarium albocarneum
 Fusarium album
 Fusarium aleurinum
 Fusarium aleyrodis
 Fusarium alkanophilum
 Fusarium allescheri
 Fusarium allescherianum
 Fusarium allii-sativi
 Fusarium alluviale
 Fusarium aloës
 Fusarium ambrosium
 Fusarium amenti
 Fusarium amentorum
 Fusarium amethysteum
 Fusarium ampelodesmi
 Fusarium andinum
 Fusarium andiyazi
 Fusarium andropogonis
 Fusarium anguioides
 Fusarium angustum
 Fusarium anisophilum
 Fusarium annulatum
 Fusarium annuum 
 Fusarium anomalum
 Fusarium anthophilum
 Fusarium apii
 Fusarium apiogenum
 Fusarium aquaeductuum1
 Fusarium arachnoideum 
 Fusarium arcuatum
 Fusarium arcuosporum
 Fusarium argillaceum
 Fusarium aridum
 Fusarium armeniacum
 Fusarium arthrosporioides
 Fusarium arundinis
 Fusarium arvense
 Fusarium asclepiadeum
 Fusarium asclerotium
 Fusarium asiaticum
 Fusarium asparagi
 Fusarium asperifoliorum
 Fusarium aspidioti
 Fusarium atrovirens
 Fusarium audinum
 Fusarium aurantiacum
 Fusarium aurantiacum
 Fusarium aureum
 Fusarium austroamericanum
 Fusarium avenaceum
 Fusarium aywerte
 Fusarium azedarachinum
 Fusarium babinda
 Fusarium baccharidicola
 Fusarium bacilligerum
 Fusarium bactridioides
 Fusarium bagnisianum
 Fusarium bambusicola
 Fusarium baptisiae
 Fusarium barbatum
 Fusarium bartholomaei
 Fusarium batatas
 Fusarium begoniae
 Fusarium berenice
 Fusarium berkeleyi
 Fusarium betae
 Fusarium beticola
 Fusarium biasolettianum
 Fusarium bicellulare
 Fusarium biforme
 Fusarium bipunctatum
 Fusarium biseptatum
 Fusarium blackmanni
 Fusarium blackmannii
 Fusarium blasticola
 Fusarium bonordenii
 Fusarium boothii
 Fusarium bostrycoides
 Fusarium botrycoides
 Fusarium brachygibbosum
 Fusarium brasilicum
 Fusarium brasiliense
 Fusarium brassicae
 Fusarium brevicatenulatum
 Fusarium briosianum
 Fusarium bubi
 Fusarium bufonicola
 Fusarium bugnicourtii
 Fusarium buharicum
 Fusarium bulbicola
 Fusarium bulbigenum
 Fusarium butleri
 Fusarium butleri
 Fusarium buxi
 Fusarium buxicola
 Fusarium byssinum
 Fusarium cactacearum
 Fusarium cacti-maxonii
 Fusarium calcareum
 Fusarium calidariorum
 Fusarium callosporum
 Fusarium camerunense
 Fusarium camptoceras
 Fusarium candidulum
 Fusarium candidum
 Fusarium candidum
 Fusarium capitatum
 Fusarium caricis
 Fusarium caries
 Fusarium carneolum
 Fusarium carneoroseum
 Fusarium carneum
 Fusarium carniformis
 Fusarium carpineum
 Fusarium carpini
 Fusarium carthami
 Fusarium castagnei
 Fusarium castaneicola
 Fusarium castaneum
 Fusarium cataleptum
 Fusarium catenulatum
 Fusarium caucasicum 
 Fusarium caudatum
 Fusarium cavispermum
 Fusarium celosiae
 Fusarium celtidis
 Fusarium cepae
 Fusarium cerasi
 Fusarium cereale
 Fusarium cerealis
 Fusarium cesatii
 Fusarium chaetomium
 Fusarium chenopodinum
 Fusarium chilense
 Fusarium chlamydosporum
 Fusarium ciliatum
 Fusarium cinctum
 Fusarium cinnabarinum
 Fusarium circinatum
 Fusarium cirrosum
 Fusarium citriforme
 Fusarium citrinum
 Fusarium citrulli
 Fusarium clavatum
 Fusarium clematidis
 Fusarium clypeaster
 Fusarium coccidicola
 Fusarium coccinellum
 Fusarium coccineum
 Fusarium coccophila
 Fusarium coccophilum
 Fusarium coeruleum
 Fusarium coffeicola
 Fusarium colorans
 Fusarium commune
 Fusarium commutatum
 Fusarium compactum
 Fusarium concentricum
 Fusarium concolor
 Fusarium conglutinans
 Fusarium congoense
 Fusarium coniosporiicola
 Fusarium constrictum
 Fusarium corallinum
 Fusarium cordae
 Fusarium cortaderiae
 Fusarium cromyophthoron
 Fusarium crookwellense
 Fusarium cruentum
 Fusarium cryptum
 Fusarium cubense
 Fusarium cucumerinum
 Fusarium cucurbitae
 Fusarium cucurbitariae
 Fusarium culmorum
 Fusarium cuneiforme
 Fusarium cuneirostrum
 Fusarium cuticola
 Fusarium cyclogenum
 Fusarium cydoniae
 Fusarium cylindricum
 Fusarium cymbiferum
 Fusarium cypericola
 Fusarium decemcellulare
 Fusarium decipiens
 Fusarium deformans
 Fusarium delacroixii
 Fusarium delphinoides
 Fusarium denticulatum
 Fusarium derridis
 Fusarium desciscens
 Fusarium detonianum
 Fusarium dianthi
 Fusarium didymum
 Fusarium diffusum
 Fusarium dimerum
 Fusarium dimorphum
 Fusarium diplosporum
 Fusarium discoideum
 Fusarium discolor
 Fusarium diversisporum
 Fusarium dlaminii
 Fusarium domesticum
 Fusarium dominicanum
 Fusarium echinosporum
 Fusarium effusum
 Fusarium eichleri
 Fusarium elasticae
 Fusarium elegans
 Fusarium eleocharidis
 Fusarium elongatum
 Fusarium ensiforme
 Fusarium enterolobii
 Fusarium entomophilum
 Fusarium epicoccum
 Fusarium epimyces
 Fusarium episphaeria
 Fusarium episphaericum
 Fusarium epistroma
 Fusarium epistromum
 Fusarium epithele
 Fusarium equinum
 Fusarium equiseti
 Fusarium equiseticola
 Fusarium equisetorum
 Fusarium erubescens
 Fusarium erubescens
 Fusarium eucalypti
 Fusarium eucalypticola
 Fusarium eucheliae
 Fusarium eumartii
 Fusarium euonymi
 Fusarium euonymi-japonici
 Fusarium euwallaceae
 Fusarium expansum
 Fusarium falcatum
 Fusarium falciforme
 Fusarium fautreyi
 Fusarium ferruginosum
 Fusarium fijikuroi
 Fusarium filiferum
 Fusarium filisporum
 Fusarium fissum
 Fusarium flavidum
 Fusarium flavum
 Fusarium flocciferum
 Fusarium foeni
 Fusarium foetens
 Fusarium foliicola
 Fusarium fractiflexum
 Fusarium fractum
 Fusarium fragrans
 Fusarium fraxini
 Fusarium fructigenum
 Fusarium fuckelii
 Fusarium fujikuroi
 Fusarium fuliginosporum
 Fusarium fungicola
 Fusarium funicola
 Fusarium fusarioides
 Fusarium fuscum
 Fusarium gaditjirri
 Fusarium gallinaceum
 Fusarium gaudefroyanum
 Fusarium gemmiperda
 Fusarium genevense
 Fusarium georginae
 Fusarium gerlachii
 Fusarium gibbosum
 Fusarium gigas
 Fusarium glandicola
 Fusarium glandicola
 Fusarium gleditschiae
 Fusarium gleditschiicola
 Fusarium globosum
 Fusarium globulosum
 Fusarium gloeosporioides
 Fusarium gloeosprioides
 Fusarium glumarum
 Fusarium gracile
 Fusarium graminearum
 Fusarium graminum
 Fusarium granulare
 Fusarium granulosum
 Fusarium guttiforme
 Fusarium gymnosporangii
 Fusarium gynerii
 Fusarium hakeae
 Fusarium heidelbergense
 Fusarium helotioides
 Fusarium herbarum
 Fusarium heteronema
 Fusarium heteronemum
 Fusarium heterosporoides
 Fusarium heterosporum
 Fusarium heveae
 Fusarium hibernans
 Fusarium hippocastani
 Fusarium hordearium
 Fusarium hordei
 Fusarium hostae
 Fusarium hydnicola
 Fusarium hymenula
 Fusarium hyperoxysporum
 Fusarium hypocreoideum
 Fusarium idahoanum
 Fusarium illosporioides
 Fusarium illudens
 Fusarium inaequale
 Fusarium incarcerans
 Fusarium incarnatum
 Fusarium inflexum
 Fusarium inseptatum
 Fusarium insidiosum
 Fusarium iridis
 Fusarium japonicum
 Fusarium javanicum
 Fusarium juglandinum
 Fusarium junci
 Fusarium jungiae
 Fusarium juruanum
 Fusarium konzum
 Fusarium kuehnii
 Fusarium kurdicum
 Fusarium kyushuense
 Fusarium laboulbeniae
 Fusarium lacertarum
 Fusarium lactis
 Fusarium lagenaria
 Fusarium lagenariae
 Fusarium lanceolatum
 Fusarium langsethiae
 Fusarium laricis
 Fusarium larvarum
 Fusarium lateritium 
 Fusarium laxum
 Fusarium leguminum
 Fusarium leucoconium7
 Fusarium lichenicola
 Fusarium limonis
 Fusarium limosum
 Fusarium lineare
 Fusarium lini
 Fusarium loliaceum
 Fusarium lolii
 Fusarium loncheceras
 Fusarium longipes
 Fusarium longisporum
 Fusarium longissimum
 Fusarium longum
 Fusarium lucidum
 Fusarium lucumae
 Fusarium lunatum
 Fusarium lunulosporum
 Fusarium luteum
 Fusarium lutulatum
 Fusarium lycopersici
 Fusarium macounii
 Fusarium macroceras
 Fusarium macroxysporum
 Fusarium maculans
 Fusarium magnusianum
 Fusarium mali
 Fusarium malli
 Fusarium malvacearum
 Fusarium mangiferae
 Fusarium marginatum
 Fusarium martiellae-discolorioides
 Fusarium martii
 Fusarium matuoi
 Fusarium maydiperdum
 Fusarium maydis
 Fusarium melanochlorum
 Fusarium meliolicola
 Fusarium merismoides
 Fusarium mesentericum
 Fusarium mesoamericanum
 Fusarium metachroum
 Fusarium mexicanum
 Fusarium microcera
 Fusarium microphlyctis
 Fusarium micropus
 Fusarium microsera
 Fusarium microspermum
 Fusarium microsporium
 Fusarium mikaniae
 Fusarium mindoanum
 Fusarium miniatulum
 Fusarium miniatum
 Fusarium minimum
 Fusarium minutissimum
 Fusarium minutulum
 Fusarium miscanthi
 Fusarium mollerianum
 Fusarium moniliforme
 Fusarium moricola
 Fusarium moronei
 Fusarium moschatum
 Fusarium muentzii
 Fusarium musarum
 Fusarium mycophilum
 Fusarium mycophytum
 Fusarium myosotidis
 Fusarium napiforme
 Fusarium nectriae-palmicolae
 Fusarium nectriae-turraeae
 Fusarium nectricreans
 Fusarium nectrioides
 Fusarium neglectum
 Fusarium negundinis
 Fusarium nelsonii
 Fusarium neoceras 
 Fusarium nervisequum
 Fusarium nicotianae
 Fusarium nigrum
 Fusarium nisikadoi
 Fusarium nitidum
 Fusarium nivale
 Fusarium niveum
 Fusarium nucicola
 Fusarium nurragi
 Fusarium nygamai
 Fusarium obtusatum
 Fusarium obtusisporum
 Fusarium obtusiusculum
 Fusarium obtusum
 Fusarium ochraceum
 Fusarium odoratissimum syn. F. oxysporum f. sp. cubense strain TR4
 Fusarium oidioides
 Fusarium opuli
 Fusarium opuntiarum
 Fusarium orchidis
 Fusarium orobanches
 Fusarium orthoceras
 Fusarium orthoceras
 Fusarium orthoconium
 Fusarium orthosporum
 Fusarium oryzae
 Fusarium osiliense
 Fusarium ossicola
 Fusarium osteophilum
 Fusarium otomycosis
 Fusarium oxydendri
 Fusarium oxysporum
 Fusarium palczewskii
 Fusarium pallens
 Fusarium pallidoroseum
 Fusarium pallidulum
 Fusarium pallidum
 Fusarium pampini
 Fusarium pandani
 Fusarium pannosum
 Fusarium parasiticum
 Fusarium parasiton
 Fusarium paspali
 Fusarium paspalicola
 Fusarium patouillardii
 Fusarium peckii
 Fusarium pelargonii
 Fusarium peltigerae
 Fusarium penicillatum
 Fusarium pentaclethrae
 Fusarium penzigii
 Fusarium perniciosum
 Fusarium persicae
 Fusarium personatum
 Fusarium pestis
 Fusarium peziziforme
 Fusarium pezizoides
 Fusarium pezizoideum
 Fusarium phacidioideum
 Fusarium phaseoli
 Fusarium phormii
 Fusarium phragmiticola
 Fusarium phragmitis
 Fusarium phyllachorae
 Fusarium phyllogenum
 Fusarium phyllophilum
 Fusarium phyllostachydicola
 Fusarium pirinum
 Fusarium platani
 Fusarium platanoidis
 Fusarium poae
 Fusarium poincianae
 Fusarium polymorphum
 Fusarium polyphialidicum
 Fusarium poncetii
 Fusarium poolense
 Fusarium proliferatum
 Fusarium protractum
 Fusarium prunorum
 Fusarium pseudacaciae
 Fusarium pseudoanthophilum
 Fusarium pseudocircinatum
 Fusarium pseudoeffusum
 Fusarium pseudograminearum
 Fusarium pseudoheterosporum
 Fusarium pseudonectria
 Fusarium pseudonygamai
 Fusarium psidii
 Fusarium pteridis
 Fusarium pucciniophilum
 Fusarium pulvinatum
 Fusarium punctiforme
 Fusarium pusillum
 Fusarium putaminum
 Fusarium putrefaciens
 Fusarium pyrinum
 Fusarium pyrochroum
  Fusarium quercicola
 Fusarium radicicola
 Fusarium ramigenum
 Fusarium ramulicola
 Fusarium redolens
 Fusarium reticulatum
 Fusarium retusum
 Fusarium rhabdophorum
 Fusarium rhizochromatistes
 Fusarium rhizogenum
 Fusarium rhizophilum
 Fusarium rhizophilum
 Fusarium rhodellum
 Fusarium rhoicola
 Fusarium ricini
 Fusarium rigidiusculum
 Fusarium rimicola
 Fusarium rimosum
 Fusarium robiniae
 Fusarium robustum
 Fusarium roesleri
 Fusarium rollandianum
 Fusarium rosae
 Fusarium roseobullatum
 Fusarium roseolum
 Fusarium roseum
 Fusarium rostratum
 Fusarium roumeguerei
 Fusarium ruberrimum
 Fusarium rubi
 Fusarium rubicolor
 Fusarium rubiginosum
 Fusarium rubrum
 Fusarium russianum
 Fusarium ruticola
 Fusarium saccardoanum
 Fusarium sacchari
 Fusarium salicicola
 Fusarium salicinum
 Fusarium salicis
 Fusarium salmonicolor
 Fusarium samararum
 Fusarium samoënse
 Fusarium sampaioi
 Fusarium sanguineum
 Fusarium sapindophilum
 Fusarium sarcochroum
 Fusarium schawrowi
 Fusarium schiedermayeri
 Fusarium schnablianum
 Fusarium schribauxii
 Fusarium schweinitzii
 Fusarium scirpi
 Fusarium scirpisensu
 Fusarium sclerodermatis
 Fusarium sclerostromaton
 Fusarium sclerotioides
 Fusarium sclerotium
 Fusarium scolecoides
 Fusarium secalis
 Fusarium seemenianum
 Fusarium serjaniae
 Fusarium setosum
 Fusarium sinensis
 Fusarium socium
 Fusarium solani
 Fusarium solani-tuberosi
 Fusarium sophorae
 Fusarium sorghi
 Fusarium spartinae
 Fusarium speiranthae
 Fusarium speiranthis
 Fusarium speiseri
 Fusarium spermogoniopsis
 Fusarium sphaeriae
 Fusarium sphaeriiforme
 Fusarium sphaeroideum
 Fusarium sphaerosporum
 Fusarium spicariae-colorantis
 Fusarium spinaciae
 Fusarium splendens
 Fusarium sporotrichiella
 Fusarium sporotrichioides
 Fusarium staphyleae
 Fusarium stercorarium
 Fusarium stercoris
 Fusarium sterilihyphosum
 Fusarium sticticum
 Fusarium stictoides
 Fusarium stilbaster
 Fusarium stilboides
 Fusarium stillatum
 Fusarium stoveri
 Fusarium striatum
 Fusarium strobilinum
 Fusarium stromaticola
 Fusarium stromaticum
 Fusarium subcarneum
 Fusarium subcorticale
 Fusarium subglutinans
 Fusarium sublunatum
 Fusarium subnivale
 Fusarium subpallidum
 Fusarium subtectum
 Fusarium subviolaceum
 Fusarium succisae
 Fusarium sulphureum
 Fusarium tabacinum
 Fusarium tabacivorum
 Fusarium tasmanicum
 Fusarium tenellum
 Fusarium tenue
 Fusarium tenuissimum
 Fusarium tenuistipes
 Fusarium terrestre
 Fusarium thapsinum
 Fusarium theobromae
 Fusarium thevetiae
 Fusarium thuemenii
 Fusarium tomentosum
 Fusarium torreyae
 Fusarium tortuosum
 Fusarium tracheiphilum
 Fusarium translucens
 Fusarium tremelloides
 Fusarium trichothecioides
 Fusarium tricinctum
 Fusarium trifolii
 Fusarium tritici
 Fusarium truncatum
 Fusarium tubercularioides
 Fusarium tuberis
 Fusarium tuberivorum
 Fusarium tucumaniae
 Fusarium tumidum
 Fusarium tunicatum
 Fusarium udum
 Fusarium ulmi
 Fusarium ulmicola
 Fusarium uncinatum
 Fusarium uniseptatum
 Fusarium uredinicola
 Fusarium urediniphilum
 Fusarium uredinum
 Fusarium urticearum
 Fusarium ussurianum
 Fusarium ustilaginis
 Fusarium vasinfectum
 Fusarium vectriae-palmicolae
 Fusarium venenatum
 Fusarium venerorum
 Fusarium ventricosum
 Fusarium veratri
 Fusarium versicolor
 Fusarium versiforme
 Fusarium verticillioides
 Fusarium victoriae
 Fusarium viniicola
 Fusarium vinosum
 Fusarium violaceum
 Fusarium violae
 Fusarium virguliforme
 Fusarium viride
 Fusarium viticola
 Fusarium vogelii
 Fusarium volutella
 Fusarium volutum
 Fusarium vorosii
 Fusarium willkommii
 Fusarium wolgense
 Fusarium wollenweberi
 Fusarium xylarioides
 Fusarium yuccae
 Fusarium zavianum
 Fusarium zeae
 Fusarium zealandicum
 Fusarium ziziphinum
 Fusarium zonatum
 Fusarium zygopetali

References 

 list
Fusarium species, List of